Darvazeh Dowlat Metro Station is the junction of Tehran Metro Line 1 and Tehran Metro Line 4. It is located in the junction of Enghelab Street, Saadi Street and Dr. Mofatteh Street. It is between Panzdah-e-Khordad Metro Station and Saadi Metro Station in Line 1 and Mellat Metro Station and Hasan Abad Metro Station. This station is a crowded station because it has connections to Tarbiat Modares University, Ferdowsi Shoe Bazar, Enghelab Book Bazar and Tehran Bus BRT1.

References

Tehran Metro stations